São João de Deus (English: Saint John of God) was a Portuguese parish (freguesia) in the municipality of Lisbon. With the 2012 Administrative Reform, the parish merged with the Alto do Pina parish into a new one named Areeiro.

Main sites
Campo Pequeno bullring
São João de Deus Church

References

Former parishes of Lisbon
2012 disestablishments in Portugal